Doctor's Daughter may refer to;

 "The Doctor's Daughter", an episode of the British science fiction series Doctor Who
 Doctor's Daughters (TV series), a 1981 British situation comedy starring Bridget Armstrong